Singapore Khalsa Association Football Club is a Singaporean football club based in Tessensohn, Singapore. 
The club is currently competing in Singapore Football League as of
2020.

See also

 Balestier Khalsa FC
 History of Indian influence on Southeast Asia
 History of Singaporean Indians
 Indian Singaporeans
 List of Indian organisations in Singapore
 Non-resident Indian and person of Indian origin
 Sikhism in Singapore

References
 Singapore Khalsa Association Takes Home NFL Division Two Trophy – Football Association of Singapore
 NFL – Singapore Khalsa Association vs Tiong Bahru FC
 SportSanity – Singapore's Premier Online Portal for Sports Enthusiasts
 Singapore Khalsa Association
 Singapore Khalsa Association
 Singapore Khalsa Association FC
 How to become a national player in Singapore? | MOFeye Sports Marketing

Football clubs in Singapore